Jezero is a village situated in Despotovac municipality in Serbia. At the time of the 2011 census, there were 367 inhabitants. This has decreased from a high of around 770 in 1953.

References

Populated places in Pomoravlje District